Wakashoyo Shunichi (born 8 March 1966 as Yoichi Babaguchi) is a Japanese mixed martial artist, kickboxer, professional wrestler and former sumo wrestler.

Career
Although born in Chiba, he grew up in Nakano, Tokyo. He joined sumo in 1981, wrestling out of Futagoyama stable. He first entered the top makuuchi division in 1991 and made his sanyaku debut in March 1993 from komusubi rank. Unusually, he came through with a winning record (which included a win over new yokozuna Akebono), and was awarded his second successive special prize for Fighting Spirit. After the tournament he was promoted to sekiwake, which was the highest rank he was to achieve. He retired in November 1997 and became an elder of the Japan Sumo Association under the name Otowayama. However, the retirement of his former stablemate, Wakanohana in March 2000 meant that his elder name was needed by the former Takamisugi (who had been borrowing Wakanohana's), and Wakashoyo had to leave the sumo world.

He then signed with K-1, a kickboxing and mixed martial arts organization, fighting under his old shikona (He uses the Latin script, appearing as "WAKASHOYO" rather than using the Japanese characters. The Sumo Association requested that Konishiki do the same thing in his post-sumo career). He made his debut in a kickboxing bout against fellow newcomer, South Korean giant Choi Hong-man in the quarter-final of the K-1 World Grand Prix 2005 in Seoul on 19 March 2005. Wakashoyo was knocked down twice in the first round; he was not able to recover from the second one. In July 2005 he entered Hero's, the mixed martial arts series promoted by K-1, against kickboxing legend Peter Aerts in an MMA bout at Hero's 2. He was again knocked out in the first round. Wakashoyo returned to the promotion against Kazuhiro Hamanaka at Hero's 5 on 3 May 2006 and was submitted with an arm lock.

In 2008 he began using his real name, Yoichi Babaguchi, as his fighting name. However, he reverted to the name Wakashoyo in December 2010 for a kickboxing match with fellow former sekitori Sentoryu. Out of shape in his first match in over two and a half years, he lost in the first round.

Babaguchi, under his Wakashoyo name, started his career in professional wrestling in Inoki Genome Federation in 2008, later changing to Real Japan Pro Wrestling in 2011.

Fighting style
During his sumo career Wakashoyo favoured yotsu-sumo, or grappling techniques. He preferred a hidari-yotsu, or right hand outside, left hand inside grip on his opponent's mawashi. His most common winning kimarite was yori-kiri, or force out, but he also liked using kotenage, or armlock throw.

Sumo career record

Kickboxing record

| colspan=10 align=center| 0 wins, 6 losses, 1 draw
|-
|Loss
|align=center|0–6–1
| Sentoryū
|TKO (3 knockdowns)
|Survivor: Round 6
|
|align=center|1
|align=center|1:09
|Tokyo, Japan
|
|-
|Loss
|align=center|0–5–1
| Noboru Tadashi
|TKO (low kicks)
|Utsunomiya Utsunomiya Vol.2
|
|align=center|1
|align=center|0:46
|Japan
|
|-
|Loss
|align=center|0–4–1
| Masami Ueno
|KO
|Chikusei Fighting Dream
|
|align=center|1
|align=center|0:40
|Japan
|
|-
|Loss
|align=center|0–3–1
| Atsushi Hamada
|KO (right low kick)
|Dragon Moero
|
|align=center|1
|align=center|1:55
|Japan
|
|-
|Loss
|align=center|0–2–1
| Gen Shiyo
|KO (right low kick)
|New Japan Kickboxing Association: Titans Neos II
|
|align=center|1
|align=center|0:54
|Japan
|
|-
| Draw
|align=center|0–1–1
| Mr. Kamikaze
|No decision
|Ryukyu Kamikaze Spirit
|
|align=center|3
|align=center|3:00
|Okinawa Prefecture, Japan
|
|-
|Loss
|align=center|0–1
| Choi Hong-man
|KO (left hook)
|K-1 World Grand Prix 2005 in Seoul
|
|align=center|1
|align=center|1:40
|Seoul, South Korea
|2005 Seoul Grand Prix quarter-final bout.
|-

Mixed martial arts record

|-
| Loss
| align=center| 1–6–1
| Kyoshiro Kawada
| KO (punches)
| Kingdom Ehrgeiz: Majors vs. Indies
| 
| align=center| 1
| align=center| N/A
| Tokyo, Japan
| 
|-
| Loss
| align=center| 1–5–1
| Hirohide Fujinuma
| TKO (punches)
| Deep: 47 Impact
| 
| align=center| 1
| align=center| 0:17
| Tokyo, Japan
| 
|-
| Loss
| align=center| 1–4–1
| Yusuke Kawaguchi
| TKO (punches)
| Deep: Megaton Grand Prix 2008 Semifinal
| 
| align=center| 1
| align=center| 0:16
| Tokyo, Japan
| 
|-
| Win
| align=center| 1–3–1
| Kintaro Tsurukame
| Submission (punches)
| Deep: Megaton Grand Prix 2008 Opening Round
| 
| align=center| 1
| align=center| 1:22
| Tokyo, Japan
| 
|-
| Loss
| align=center| 0–3–1
| Kengo Watanabe
| TKO (punches)
| GCM: Cage Force EX Western Bound
| 
| align=center| 1
| align=center| 0:20
| Tottori, Japan
| 
|-
| Loss
| align=center| 0–2–1
| Kazuhiro Hamanaka
| Submission (kimura)
| K-1: Hero's 5
| 
| align=center| 1
| align=center| 1:22
| Tokyo, Japan
| 
|-
| Draw
| align=center| 0–1–1
| Soichi Nishida
| Draw
| GCM: D.O.G. 4
| 
| align=center| 2
| align=center| 5:00
| Tokyo, Japan
| 
|-
| Loss
| align=center| 0–1
| Peter Aerts
| TKO (punches)
| K-1: Hero's 2
| 
| align=center| 1
| align=center| 1:36
| Tokyo, Japan
|

See also
Glossary of sumo terms
List of sumo tournament second division champions
List of past sumo wrestlers
List of sekiwake

References

External links

Sumo record
Profession MMA record for Wakashoyo

1966 births
Living people
Japanese sumo wrestlers
Sumo people from Chiba Prefecture
Sekiwake
Heavyweight kickboxers
Japanese male mixed martial artists
Super heavyweight mixed martial artists
Sportspeople from Tokyo
Japanese male kickboxers
Mixed martial artists utilizing Sumo
Mixed martial artists utilizing kickboxing
Mixed martial artists utilizing wrestling